Chiyangal is a 2020 Indian Tamil-language film written and directed by Vaigarai Balan. The film stars Karikalan and Risha, with Nalinikanth and several senior newcomers in supporting roles.

Cast 
Karikalan 
Risha 
Nalinikanth
Pasupathiraj
Samuthira Seeni
 Eswar Thiyagarajan
Sakthivel
Narayanasamy
Durai Sundaram

Production 
The film is directed by Vaigarai Balan, who previously directed Kadikara Manithargal (2018). The film was shot in Theni and Meghamalai. The film introduces seventy new faces. Chiyangal has a similar premise to Varuthapadatha Valibar Sangam (2013). The film was released under the English title Oldage Villagers.

Soundtrack
Music by Muthamil.

Release 
A critic from The Times of India gave the film a rating of two-and-a-half out of five stars and opined that "But as the movie inches towards its climax, some of the scenes become melodramatic and the dialogues about protecting parents, though relevant, appear preachy". A critic from Dinamalar gave the film a rating of three-and-a-quarter out of five stars and praised the unique storyline.

Awards 
2020 - Foreign Features Category at the WorldFest-Houston International Film & Video Festival - Silver Remi Award
Five Continents International Film Festival
 Grantville International Film Festival
L’Age d’Or International Arthouse Film Festival

Notes

References

External links